, professionally known by her stage name,  and formerly known as R, is a Japanese singer, songwriter, businesswoman, fashion model, and YouTuber. Born in Higashiōsaka, Japan, she won the first season of the audition Super Starlight Contest, winning a recording contract with Giza Studio. Her eurobeat-sounding debut album, Be Happy (2001) was certified gold in Japan and spawned a top-five single, "Koi wa Thrill, Shock, Suspense", which served as the theme song to the Japanese anime  television series Case Closed. Aiuchi's second album Power of Words became her best-selling album, selling over 419,000 copies nationwide and certificated platinum in Japan.

In 2010, Kakiuchi announced her retirement from the music industry and founded a dog clothing brand Bon Bon Copine in September 2012. She later resumed her musical activities, appearing on several television shows in 2015 and releasing a single "Warm Prayer" in 2018 under the new stage name, R.

Early life 
Kakiuchi was born on 31 July 1980, in Higashiōsaka, Osaka. She attended Tezukayama High School. In her high school years, Kakiuchi began working as a model, appearing on Cawaii! and participated in several music auditions, following advice from her friends. In 1998, Kakiuchi attended Doshisha Women's College of Liberal Arts.

Career

1998–1999: Pre-debut period 
In July 1998, Kakiuchi's cover of "Desperado" was released as a part of the euro-beat compilation album Eurobeat Flash Vol.19, via Cutting Edge. In the spring of 1999, she won the first season of the audition show Super Starlight Contest and received a recording contract with Giza Studio.

2000–2002: Be Happy and Power of Words 
In March 2000, Kakiuchi made her debut as Rina Aiuchi with her first single "Close to Your Heart", the theme song to the Japanese animated television series Monster Rancher. The single was a moderate success, selling approximately 64,000 copies and peaking at number nineteen on the Oricon Weekly Singles Chart. The second and third singles from her debut album; "It's Crazy for You" and "Ohh! Paradise Taste!!" were released to moderate success, peaking in Japan at number sixteen and twenty-three, respectively. Her fourth single "Koi wa Thrill, Shock, Suspense" achieved nationwide success, reaching number five, selling over 100,000 copies. The song attracted considerable attention for serving as the theme song to the Japanese animated television series Case Closed. On 24 January 2001, Kakiuchi's debut album Be Happy was released to a commercial success. The eurobeat-influenced J-pop album peaked at number three and has certificated Gold in Japan. In support of the album, Aiuchi embarked on her first concert tour, Rina Aiuchi Club Circuit 2001 "Be Happy". In March 2001, Kakiuchi earned a Japan Gold Disc Award for New Artist of the Year.

In April 2001, "Faith" was released as the lead single from the second album. To promote the song, Kakiuchi appeared on several television music shows like CDTV. The song achieved a moderate success, reaching number eight on the Oricon chart. Kakiuchi's second album Power of Words was released in May 2002. The album has spawned three top-five singles: "Forever You ~Eien ni Kimi to~", "I Can't Stop My Love for You", and "Navy Blue" was released as the third single from the album in October 2001. The J-pop ballad song succeeded commercially, peaking at number two in Japan and has sold over 127,000 copies in Japan. As of November 2020, "Navy Blue" has remained Kakiuchi's the best-selling song. Power of Words achieved a massive success in Japan, topping on the Oricon chart and certificated Platinum by RIAJ. The album has been her best-selling album as of September 2018, with the sales of over 419,000 copies. From 16 June 2002, Kakiuchi embarked on the concert tour, entitled Rina Aiuchi Live Tour 2002 "Power of Words" in support of the album.

2003–2004: A.I.R. and Playgirl 
The album The double A-side single, "Sincerely Yours"/"Can You Feel the Power of Words?" was released in August 2002. The former served as the lead single from Aiuchi's third album, while the latter being the sixth single from her second album Power of Words. The single has sold approximately 82,000 copies in Japan and been certificated Gold by RIAJ, peaking at number four on the Oricon chart. Aiuchi released the first remix album Rina Aiuchi Remixes Cool City Production Vol.5 in July 2003. The album was a commercial success, selling over 70,000 copies and reaching number four on the Oricon chart. Aiuchi's third studio album, AIR was released on 15 October 2003, simultaneously with the sixth single from the album, "Kūki". The album became Aiuchi's second number-one hit in Japan and has certificated Gold by RIAJ. A.I.R. has spawned five top three singles: "Deep Freeze" was released in November 2002, as the second single from the album. The follow-up single, "Kaze no nai Umi de Dakishimete" served as the theme song to the Japanese drama Tsuribaka Nisshi. The fourth single from the album, "Full Jump" was released to a success, peaking at number three on the Oricon chart and certificated Gold by RIAJ. Aiuchi embarked on the concert tour Rina Aiuchi Live Tour 2003 "A.I.R." in November 2003, however, she struggled with aphonia of uncertain cause during the show at Nakano Sun Plaza in Nakano, Tokyo. In December 2003, Aiuchi's first compilation album Single Collection was released. The album reached number eight in Japan and later certificated Gold by RIAJ. On 31 December 2003, Aiuchi achieved a first appearance on Kōhaku Uta Gassen with "Full Jump".

The lead single from her fourth album, "Dream×Dream" was released in April 2004. The song served as the theme song to the Japanese animated movie Detective Conan: Magician of the Silver Sky and peaked at number sixth on the Oricon chart. Her fourth album Playgirl was released in December 2004. The R&B-influenced J-pop album peaked at number seven and managed to sell 100,000 copies in Japan. The album has yielded three singles: "Dream×Dream", "Start", and "Boom-Boom-Boom".

2005–2008: Delight and Trip 
In May 2005, "Akaku Atsui Kodō" was released as the lead single from Aiuchi's fifth studio album. The song served as the theme song to the Japanese Tokusatsu series Ultraman Nexus and reached number seven on the Oricon chart. The double-A side single "Glorious"/"Precious Place" was released in March 2006 as the third single from the album. Both songs served the theme song to the PlayStation role-playing video game Another Century's Episode 2. The single was a success, peaking at number five and sold over 26,000 copies in Japan. Her fifth album Delight was released in May 2006. The dance music-tasted J-pop album was received well by her fans and reached number four in Japan. In support of the album, Aiuchi embarked on the concert tour Rina Aiuchi Live Tour 2006 "Delight" from 8 June 2006. In June 2006, Aiuchi released a collaboration single with U-ka Saegusa, "100 mono Tobira", under the name of Rina Aiuchi and U-ka Saegusa. The song was written for the Japanese television animated series Case Closed and sold approximately 30,000 copies in Japan. In addition to her work for Delight, Aiuchi appeared on the track "Ai Epilogue" on Tsunku's album Type 2.

In April 2007, the second single as Rina Aiuchi and U-ka Saegusa, "Nanatsu no Umi wo Wataru Kaze no yō ni" was released to a commercial success, selling over 36,500 copies in Japan. The song was written for the Japanese animated movie Detective Conan: Jolly Roger in the Deep Azure. Aiuchi's sixth studio album Trip was released in May 2008. The album yielded one top-ten single: "Nemurenu Yo ni"/"Party Time Party Up" and managed to enter top-ten in Japan.

2009: Thanx and All Singles Best: Thanx 10th Anniversary 
In March 2009, Aiuchi's seventh studio album Thanx was released. The album failed to enter top-ten in Japan and managed to sell around 22,000 copies nationwide. The album has yielded one top-ten single: "Friend"/"Sugao no mama".

In July 2009, Aiuchi released the double-A side single "Story"/"Summer Light". The single peaked at number nine on the Oricon chart and sold approximately 6,700 copies in Japan. The follow-up single, "Magic" was released in October 2009. Although the song failed to enter the top-ten in Japan, the sales surpassed last single, with the total sales of 8,600 copies. Aiuchi's second compilation album All Singles Best: Thanx 10th Anniversary was released in December 2009. The album succeeded commercially, reaching number seven on the Oricon chart and selling over 38,000 copies in Japan.

2010–2011: Last Scene and retirement 
In March 2010, Aiuchi released her first B-side tracks compilation album Colors. The album failed commercially and sold only 4,500 copies in Japan. On 30 July 2010, Aiuchi announced that she would retire from the music industry at the end of the year, because of the thyroid deficiency. Her eighth and last studio album Last Scene was released in September 2010. The album debuted at number eight on the Oricon chart and sold approximately 20,600 copies in Japan. The album has yielded four singles: "Good Days", "Sing a Song", "C Love R", and "Hanabi". On 31 December 2010, Aiuchi's first box set Rina Aiuchi Premier Box 2000–2010 was released exclusively on her fan club and the web store of her label, Giza Studio. In September 2011, her second remix album Forever Songs: Brand New Remixes was released.

2012–present: Post-retirement and comeback 
In September 2012, Aiuchi announced that she had founded a dog clothing company, Bon Bon Copine. Soon, she achieved success as a businesswoman, leading the company to success with 50 million yen of the yearly turnover.

In September 2015, Aiuchi appeared on the Japanese television music show, The Karaoke Battle and covered "Hello, Again (Mukashi Kara Aru Basho)" by My Little Lover and "Love Story" by Namie Amuro. The appearance marked her comeback to the music industry and since then, she has performed at several shows. In April 2018, Aiuchi released her first song since 2010, "Warm Prayer" under the name of R. The song managed to enter a top on the RecoChoku high-resolution songs chart. Aiuchi released her first studio album in ten years, Ring, in March 2020.

In March 2021, Aiuchi accused her former producer of the sexual harassments and filed a lawsuit against her former talent agent, Giza Artist, seeking 10 million yen, alleging that they did not protect her from the harassments. In the same month, Aiuchi announced that she would resume the musical activities under her former stage name, Rina Aiuchi.

Discography 

Be Happy (2001)
Power of Words (2002)
A.I.R. (2003)
Playgirl (2004)
Delight (2006)
Trip (2008)
Thanx (2009)
Last Scene (2010)
Ring (2020)

Filmography

Awards and nominations

References

External links 
 
 Asian-Stuff.com – Rina Aiuchi Reviews
 Rina Aiuchi Good Life Blog (Japanese)

1980 births
Being Inc. artists
Japanese women pop singers
Living people
Musicians from Osaka Prefecture
People from Higashiōsaka
20th-century Japanese women singers
20th-century Japanese singers
21st-century Japanese women singers
21st-century Japanese singers